Magenium Solutions LLC is an information technology (IT) consulting, systems integration and outsourcing company headquartered in Glen Ellyn, Illinois. It was founded in 2007 by Colleen LaMantia and Tim Traxinger.

Magenium Solutions is a Microsoft Solutions Partner and therefore offers Microsoft centered IT Services. Their main area of focus is the workforce productivity, Microsoft application services, enterprise mobility and unified communications.

Connected home and business
 On April 21, 2015, Magenium Solutions LLC announced the "Connected Home and Office" business practice as a new addition to the company's offerings.

Custom applications
 On November 1, 2013, Magenium Solutions LLC announced the availability of its productivity application, GatherNote. The application is currently available on the Apple App Store.

Public recognition
 On August 27, 2014, Magenium Solutions LLC announced that the company received the Annual Award for Excellence in Building Design from the Village of Glen Ellyn, IL.

References

International information technology consulting firms
Management consulting firms of the United States
Companies based in DuPage County, Illinois
International management consulting firms
2007 establishments in Illinois
Consulting firms established in 2007